Genda Lal Chaudhary is an Indian politician and a member of the 16th Legislative Assembly of India. He represents the Hathras constituency of Uttar Pradesh and is a member of the Bahujan Samaj Party political party.

Early life and education
Genda Lal Chaudhary was born in Aligarh district. He attended the D. S. Degree college,  Aligarh and attained Bachelor of Arts degree.

Political career
Genda Lal Chaudhary has been a MLA for two terms. He represented the Hathras constituency and was a member of the Bahujan Samaj Party political party. On 16 December 2016, Chaudhary crossed the floor and joined the Bharatiya Janata Party.

Posts held

Sub divisional officer (mtnl)

See also
 Aligarh (Assembly constituency)
 Sixteenth Legislative Assembly of Uttar Pradesh
 Uttar Pradesh Legislative Assembly

References

Bahujan Samaj Party politicians from Uttar Pradesh
Bharatiya Janata Party politicians from Uttar Pradesh
Uttar Pradesh MLAs 2007–2012
Uttar Pradesh MLAs 2012–2017
People from Aligarh district
1951 births
Living people